The 2009–10 UAE President's Cup was the 34th season of the UAE President's Cup, the premier knockout tournament for association football clubs in the United Arab Emirates.

The format has changed from previous editions, from a straight knockout tournament to a Group Phase tournament starting from Round 1

The cup winner were guaranteed a place in the 2011 AFC Champions League.

Round One

Groups
Four groups containing three or four teams

Fixtures and results

Group A

Group B

Group C

Group D

Round of 16

16 teams play a knockout tie. 8 clubs advance to the next round. Ties played over 23 & 24 November 2009

Quarter finals

8 teams play a knockout tie. 4 clubs advance to the next round. Ties played over 25 & 26 December 2009

Kickoff times are in GMT.

Semi finals

4 teams play a knockout tie. 2 clubs advance to the final. Ties played over 22 & 23 January 2010

Kickoff times are in GMT.

Final

Kickoff times are in GMT.

Top goalscorers

UAE President's Cup seasons
President's Cup
UAE Presidents Cup